Tom Carl Ernst Grönberg (born 8 March 1941 Helsinki)is a Finnish diplomat and Master of Law (1971). He has been Ambassador to Nairobi and Addis Ababa 1983–1987, Deputy Director General of the Legal Department of the Ministry for Foreign Affairs 1987–1990 and Head of Department 1990–1994. He was an Ambassador to the Council of Europe in 1994–1998 and in Vienna, Ljubljana and Bratislava 1998–2005.

References 

Ambassadors of Finland to Kenya
Ambassadors of Finland to Ethiopia
Ambassadors of Finland to Austria
Ambassadors of Finland to Slovakia
Ambassadors of Finland to Slovenia
Lawyers from Helsinki
1941 births
Diplomats from Helsinki
Living people
Permanent Representatives of Finland to the United Nations
Permanent Representatives of Finland to the European Union